Salomão Mazuad Salha (born 24 November 1972) is a former professional footballer who played as a midfielder. Born in Brazil, Salomão is of Lebanese descent from his father's side: he represented Lebanon internationally in 2001.

Early life 
Salomão was born in Floriano, a city located in the Brazilian state of Piauí. His father, Constantin, was a Lebanese businessman considered one of the most traditional representatives of Arab immigrants in Floriano and died on February 9, 2008.

International career
Salomão represented Lebanon at the World Cup 2002 Qualifying in May 2001.

See also
 List of Lebanon international footballers born outside Lebanon

References

External links
 
 
 
 CBF 
 Futpédia (Globo) 
 Jogador piauiense atua há seis anos no Líbano 

1972 births
Living people
Sportspeople from Piauí
Lebanese footballers
Lebanon international footballers
Brazilian emigrants to Lebanon
Brazilian footballers
Citizens of Lebanon through descent
Association football midfielders
Sagesse SC footballers
Safa SC players
Lebanese Premier League players